SingStar Take That is a competitive karaoke video game for the PlayStation 2 and PlayStation 3.  It is the third band-specific SingStar game released in the UK and Australia, following up on SingStar ABBA and SingStar Queen.  It was released in 2009.

Gameplay
SingStar games require players to sing along with music in order to score points. Players interface with their console via SingStar USB microphones while a music video plays in the background. The pitch players are required to sing is displayed as horizontal grey bars, which function similar to a musical stave, with corresponding lyrics displayed at the bottom of the screen. The game analyses a player's pitch and compares it to the original track, with players scoring points based on how accurate their singing is. Different modes of SingStar may vary this basic pattern, but the principle is similar throughout.

SingStar includes a variety of game modes. The standard singing mode allows one or two people to sing simultaneously, either competitively or in a duet.

The PlayStation 3 version of the game supports trophies.

Launch

SingStar Take That was launched at the SingStar Take That Extravaganza charity party on Wednesday 25 November 2009 at the Tabanacle in Notting Hill. The event was hosted by comedian James Corden and featured a number of celebrity guests including Kate Moss, Pixie Geldof, Rachel Stevens, Remi Nicole, Paloma Faith and the band Take That themselves. The event came later than originally scheduled and after the game launched in the shops due to the unfortunate death of Gary Barlow's father. The band entertained guests by performing their song "Rule The World" on the game.

Track list 
"A Million Love Songs"
"Babe" 
"Back for Good"
"Beautiful World"
"Could It Be Magic"
"Do What U Like"
"Everything Changes"
"Greatest Day"
"Hold Up a Light"
"I'd Wait for Life"
"It Only Takes a Minute"
"Love Ain't Here Anymore" 
"Never Forget"
"Once You've Tasted Love"
"Patience"
"Pray"
"Promises"
"Reach Out" 
"Relight My Fire"
"Rule the World"
"Said It All"
"Shine"
"Sure"
"Up All Night"

Reception

The PlayStation 3 version received "favorable" reviews, while the PlayStation 2 version received "average" reviews, according to the review aggregation website GameRankings.

References

External links
 

ca:SingStar
2009 video games
Band-centric video games
Karaoke video games
London Studio games
Multiplayer and single-player video games
PlayStation 2 games
PlayStation 3 games
SingStar
Sony Interactive Entertainment games
Take That
Video games developed in the United Kingdom
de:SingStar
es:SingStar (serie)
fi:SingStar
fr:Singstar
gl:Sing Star
it:SingStar
nl:SingStar
no:SingStar
pl:SingStar
pt:SingStar
sv:Singstar